José de Yanguas y Messía, 11th Viscount of Santa Clara de Avedillo (25 February 1890, in Linares, Jaén, Spain – 30 June 1974, in Madrid, Spain) was a Spanish noble, politician and diplomat who served as Minister of State and president of the National Assembly during the dictatorship of Primo de Rivera and Ambassador to the Holy See during that of General Francisco Franco. A fervent monarchist, he conspired against the Spanish Second Republic, and worked with Accion Espanola, a group and magazine which endeavoured to lay ideological foundations for a rebellion. He joined the Uprising of 1936 as soon as it began and drew up the Junta's decree of 29 September 1936 that proclaimed Franco Chief of the government of the Spanish State.

He was son of Don José de Yanguas y Ximénez and of Doña Mª de la Blanca Messía y Almansa, of the IX marquises of Busianos. He married in Madrid, the 6 May 1928, Doña Rosario Pérez de Herrasti y Orellana, daughter of Don Antonio Pérez de Herrasti y Pérez de Herrasti, IV Count of Antillón, and Doña Mª de la Concepción Orellana, XIII Marchioness of Albayda, Grandee of Spain. They had a single son, Josñe de Yanguas y Pérez de Herrasti.

References

Viscounts of Spain
Foreign ministers of Spain
Presidents of the Congress of Deputies (Spain)
1890 births
1974 deaths
Dictatorship of Primo de Rivera